Elizabeth Patricia Carnegy of Lour, Baroness Carnegy of Lour, FRSA, DL (28 April 1925 – 9 November 2010) was a Scottish academic and activist.

The daughter of Lieutenant-Colonel Ughtred Elliott Carnegy of Lour, and his wife, Violet, Elizabeth Carnegy was educated at Downham School in Essex. She worked in the Cavendish Laboratory in Cambridge from 1943 to 1946 and was president for Scotland of the Girl Guides Association from 1979 to 1989. She was a member of the Council and Finance Committee of Open University from 1984 to 1996. She was a member of the court of the St Andrews University from 1991 to 1996. Beginning in 1989, she was an honorary member of the Scottish Library Association.
 
Carnegy was chair of the Working Party on Professional Training in Community Education Scotland (1975–77), Commissioner at Manpower Services Commission (1979–1982), and a member of the Scottish Council for Tertiary Education (1979–1984). From 1980 to 1983, she was chairman of the Manpower Services Commission Committee for Scotland. From 1980 to 1983, she was a member of the Scottish Economic Council. In 1981, she became chair of the Scottish Council for Community Education, and in 1984 became a member of the administration council of the Royal Jubilee Trust, holding both posts until 1988.

On 14 July 1982, she was made a life peer with the title Baroness Carnegy of Lour, of Lour in the District of Angus and in 1993, an Honorary Fellow of the Scottish Community Education Council. Carnegy was a Fellow of the Royal Society of Arts (FRSA) and a Deputy Lieutenant for Angus from 1988 until her death. She was awarded an Hon. LLD from the University of Dundee in 1991, and from St Andrews University in 1997 as well as Doctor of the Open University in 1998. Between 1969 and 1984, she was Honorary Sheriff of Angus.

References

Sources

1925 births
2010 deaths
Alumni of the University of Dundee
Alumni of the University of St Andrews
Carnegy of Lour
Deputy Lieutenants of Angus
Life peeresses created by Elizabeth II
People associated with the Open University
People associated with the University of St Andrews
Place of birth missing
Place of death missing